Skip Away (April 4, 1993 – May 14, 2010), was a champion American Thoroughbred racehorse who was the 1998 Horse of the Year, 1996 Champion Three-Year-Old, and 1997 and 1998 Champion Handicap Horse. He won 10 Grade One races for $9,616,360 in prize money.

Breeding
Bred by Anna Marie Barnhart, Skip Away was foaled and reared at Hilmer Schmidt's Indian Hill Farm in Florida. The son of Skip Trial, out of the Diplomat's Way mare Ingot Way, Skip Away was purchased for the modest sum of $30,000 at a two-year-olds in training sale in Ocala, Florida by Hall of Fame trainer Hubert "Sonny" Hine for his wife. Carolyn Hine had particularly wanted a gray horse because vision problems made it difficult for her to see any other kind on the race track.

Racing record
Skip Away won one of six starts as a two-year-old, placing in the Cowdin and Remsen Stakes at Belmont Park. His first stakes win came as a three-year-old, when he defeated eventual Preakness Stakes winner Louis Quatorze by six lengths in the Blue Grass Stakes while setting a new stakes record over a wet-fast track at Keeneland Race Course.

After an unaccountably poor performance in the Kentucky Derby, Skip Away finished second in both the Preakness Stakes and Belmont Stakes, losing the latter by a length to Editor's Note after a prolonged duel down the long stretch. He won the 1996 Haskell Invitational Handicap and in October of that year, he defeated Cigar, winner of 17 of his previous 18 races, in the Jockey Club Gold Cup at Belmont Park. Seizing the lead entering the stretch, Skip Away won by a neck over the steadily closing champion.

Formal Gold defeated Skip Away in four of their six meetings in 1997. After Skip Away was soundly defeated as a four-year-old by Formal Gold in the Philip H. Iselin Breeders' Cup Handicap at Monmouth Park and in the Woodward Stakes at Belmont Park, he was given a new rider, Jerry Bailey, who replaced Shane Sellers.  With Bailey at the reins, Skip Away adopted a new front-running style and won nine consecutive races, including a six-length victory in the 1997 Breeders' Cup Classic, contested that year at Hollywood Park Racetrack, setting a record time of 1:59:16 under another new rider, Mike Smith.

As a five-year-old, Skip Away won seven consecutive races including five Grade I events, such as the 1998 Pimlico Special, Hollywood Gold Cup, and Woodward Stakes. Although he failed to repeat his Breeders' Cup win at Churchill Downs, he was voted the Eclipse Award as both Champion Handicap Horse and Horse of the Year for 1998.  He was retired to stud that fall with 18 wins and 34 in-the-money finishes from 38 career starts and earnings of $9,616,360.

Stud record
During his 12 years at stud, Skip Away sired 489 foals and from the nine crops of racing age, he had 21 stakes winners, who earned $19,424,552 His more notable offspring include Skipshot (Swaps Stakes), Skip Code (Grey Stakes), and Sister Swank (Valley View Stakes).

At age seventeen, Skip Away died of an apparent heart attack in his paddock on May 14, 2010 at Hopewell Farm in Midway, Kentucky. Skip Away is interred at Old Friends Farm in Georgetown, Kentucky.

Honors
Skip Away was inducted into National Museum of Racing and Hall of Fame in 2004. In the Blood-Horse magazine ranking of the top 100 U.S. Thoroughbred champions of the 20th Century, Skip Away was ranked No.32.

In 2001, Gulfstream Park Racetrack in Hallandale Beach, Florida honored Skip Away by renaming its Broward Handicap the Skip Away Handicap.

Pedigree

See also
List of leading Thoroughbred racehorses

References

External links
 Skip Away's pedigree, with photo

1993 racehorse births
2010 racehorse deaths
Racehorses trained in the United Kingdom
Racehorses bred in Florida
Breeders' Cup Classic winners
American Grade 1 Stakes winners
Eclipse Award winners
American Thoroughbred Horse of the Year
United States Thoroughbred Racing Hall of Fame inductees
Thoroughbred family 14-f
Old Friends Equine Retirement